The Asian Para-Badminton Championships is a tournament organized by the Para Badminton World Federation (PBWF) which has now merged with the BWF. This tournament is hosted to crown the best para-badminton players in Asia.

The inaugural edition of the tournament was hosted in Yeoju, South Korea in 2012.

Championships

Individual championships 
The table below states all the host cities (and their countries) of the Asia Championships. South Korea hosted the 2012 edition of the championships and hosted a total of 18 events. China hosted the championships in 2016 and won a total of 8 gold medals in the championships.

All-time medal table

Past winners

2012 Yeoju

2016 Beijing

See also 

 Badminton Asia Championships
 Badminton Asia Junior Championships

Note

References

External links 

 Historical Results of Asia Championships

 
Badminton
Asia